Schwielochsee is a municipality in the district of Dahme-Spreewald in Brandenburg in Germany formed of 10 small villages. It is located at the southern shores of the lake Schwielochsee.

Demography

References

Localities in Dahme-Spreewald